The Chery V5, also known as Eastar Cross, is a compact MPV produced by the Chinese manufacturer Chery Automobile from June 2006 to 2015.

History 
The Chery V5 or Eastar Cross was originally revealed at the Beijing Motor Show in 2004 by Chinese manufacturer Chery, the original Eastar Cross is built on the same platform as the second generation Chery Eastar and served as the estate version of the Eastar mid-size sedan. Chery unveiled their updated V5 at the Hangzhou Motor Show on June 5, 2015. The V5 is a crossover combining estate with MPV and seats up to seven, and is rebadged and sold as the Rely V5 in China and Chery Destiny in certain foreign markets.

Malaysia 

The Chery V5 was first introduced in Malaysia on 2 July 2006. It came with a 2.0 liter petrol engine and was called the Chery B14.

A locally assembled version was launched on 3 September 2008 and was sold as the Chery Eastar. It is mated to a 4-speed automatic transmission with manual shifting. It came with 1 year free service (for the first 1,000 units sold) and a 3+2 year warranty.

Later, while opening a 3S center in Section 13, Petaling Jaya, they launched a version called the "ST". It added a new grille, LED running lights, a bodykit as well as some improvements to the interior material and trim. The vehicle, available only in a red exterior shade, went for RM96,888 on-the-road. June 2013 saw Chery Malaysia launch the Eastar XT.

References

External links
Official website of the V5 (Eastar Cross)
Chery V5 (Eastar) Review

V5
Minivans
Compact MPVs
Front-wheel-drive vehicles
Cars introduced in 2006
Cars of China
2010s cars